Bagrat V the Great (died 1393) from the Bagrationi dynasty was the son of the Georgian king David IX of Georgia by his wife Sindukhtar Jaqeli. He was co-ruler from 1355, and became king after the death of his father in 1360.

Life 
A fair and popular ruler, also known as a perfect soldier, he was dubbed "Bagrat the Great" by his multi-ethnic subjects. The Trapezuntine chronicler Michael Panaretos, a contemporary of the king, describes him as "a most excellent general."

Later he was an ally of the khan of the Golden Horde, Tokhtamysh, in his war with Timur (also known as Tamerlane). In late autumn 1386, a huge army of Timur's attacked Georgia. Tbilisi was besieged and taken on 21 November 1386, after a fierce fight. The city was pillaged and Bagrat V and his family were imprisoned. Taking advantage of this disaster, the royal vassal Duke Alexander I of Imereti proclaimed himself an independent ruler and was crowned king of Imereti at the Gelati Monastery in 1387.

In order to secure his release, Bagrat V agreed to convert from Orthodox Christianity and become Muslim, though it is assumed that his conversion was not real but rather one of convenience.  Timur agreed to free Bagrat and sent him with 12,000 troops back to Georgia. However, with secret aid from Bagrat, his son George completely destroyed Timur's force and released the king.

In the spring of 1387, Timur again invaded Georgia but could not force the Georgians to submission. News of a revolt in Persia and an invasion of Azerbaijan by the Golden horde forced Timur to withdraw. 

In 1389, on the death of Alexander of Imereti, Bagrat was able to reduce his successor to a vassal duke again.

He died in 1393, leaving the throne to his son George.

Family and children
George VII was Bagrat V's son with his first wife, Helena Megale Komnene, who died in 1366. In June 1367, Bagrat V married Anna Megale Komnene, daughter of Emperor Alexios III of Trebizond and Theodora Kantakouzene at Makriali Church in Lazia. She gave birth to four children: 

 Constantine I
 David
 Tamar (subsequently wife of Prince Eles Baratashvili)
 Olympias (Ulumpia; subsequently wife of Kakhaber Chijavadze, Prince-Chamberlain of Georgia).

References

Kings of Georgia
Bagrationi dynasty of the Kingdom of Georgia
1393 deaths
Eastern Orthodox monarchs
Former Georgian Orthodox Christians
Converts to Islam from Eastern Orthodoxy
Year of birth unknown